Abate may refer to:

 Abate (surname)
 A brand name for the insecticide temefos
 ABATE, a motorcycle and motorcyclist rights organization 
 The Italian word for abbot and abbé

See also
 Abatement (disambiguation)
 Abbate
 Abatte